Water polo was contested for men only at the 1975 Pan American Games in Mexico City, Mexico.

Competing teams
Five teams contested the event.

Medalists

References

 Pan American Games water polo medalists on HickokSports

P
1975 Pan American Games
1975
1975